The Island on Bird Street is a 1997 Danish produced drama film directed by Søren Kragh-Jacobsen. It is based on the novel The Island on Bird Street.

Cast 
 Patrick Bergin as Stefan
 Jordan Kiziuk as Alex
 Jack Warden as Boruch
 James Bolam as Doctor Studjinsky
 Stefan Sauk as Goehler
 Simon Gregor as Henryk
 Lee Ross as Freddy
 Suzanna Hamilton as Stasya's Mother
 Sian Nicola Liquorish as Stasya
 Michael Byrne as Bolek
 Heather Tobias as Mrs. Studjinsky
 Leon Silver as Mr. Gryn
 Sue Jones-Davies as Mrs. Gryn

Awards 
It was entered into the 47th Berlin International Film Festival. Zbigniew Preisner won the Silver Bear for an outstanding single achievement and Jordan Kiziuk won an Honourable Mention.

References

External links 
 
 

1997 drama films
1997 films
Danish drama films
English-language Danish films
Danish World War II films
Rescue of Jews during the Holocaust
Holocaust films
Films set in the 1940s
Films about Jews and Judaism
Films based on Israeli novels
Films directed by Søren Kragh-Jacobsen
Films scored by Zbigniew Preisner
Films set in Poland
1990s English-language films